Amephana anarrhini is a moth of the family Noctuidae. It is found in Italy, southern France and the Iberian Peninsula.

The wingspan is 28–32 mm. Adults are on wing from April to June in one generation per year.

The larvae feed on Helianthemum nummularium.

References

External links

Lot Moths and Butterflies
Lepiforum.de

Cuculliinae
Moths of Europe
Moths described in 1840
Taxa named by Philogène Auguste Joseph Duponchel